Jang Kuk-chol (born 16 February 1994) is a North Korean international football centre back, currently playing club football for Hwaebul in the DPR Korea Premier Football League.

International goals
Scores and results list North Korea's goal tally first.

References

External links 
 
 
Jang Kuk-chol at DPRKFootball

1994 births
Living people
North Korean footballers
North Korea international footballers
Footballers at the 2014 Asian Games
2015 AFC Asian Cup players
2019 AFC Asian Cup players
Asian Games medalists in football
Asian Games silver medalists for North Korea

Association football central defenders
Footballers at the 2018 Asian Games
Medalists at the 2014 Asian Games
21st-century North Korean people